The London and South Western Railway K10 Class was a class of 40 4-4-0 steam locomotives designed for mixed traffic work.  They were introduced on the London and South Western Railway in 1901 and 1902 to the design of Dugald Drummond, where they earned the nickname "Small Hoppers".

Background 
In order to satisfy a pressing requirement for mixed-traffic locomotives, Drummond adopted the solution of a small-wheeled 4-4-0 he had previously employed on the Caledonian Railway. The resulting K10 had the same  diameter coupled wheels as the M7 and the boiler was interchangeable with the M7, 700 and C8 classes

Construction history 
Forty of the class were subsequently outshopped from the LSWR's Nine Elms Locomotive Works.  They were generally paired with a 6-wheel tender because of their intended short journey lengths, which included local stopping trains and medium-level freight haulage, but as with the later L11 class, some could occasionally be seen with a  "watercart" tender for longer trips.

Livery and numbering

LSWR and Southern

Livery under the LSWR was Drummond's LSWR Passenger Sage Green, with purple-brown edging and black and white lining.  Under Southern Railway ownership from grouping in 1923, the locomotives were outshopped in Richard Maunsell's darker version of the LSWR Sage Green with yellow lettering on the tender, with black and white lining.  This livery was continued under Oliver Bulleid despite his experimentations with Malachite green, though the 'Southern' lettering on the tender was changed to the 'Sunshine Yellow' style.  During the Second World War, members of the class outshopped form overhaul were turned out in wartime black. The class was haphazardly numbered by the LSWR.  Numbering under the Southern retained the LSWR allocations.

Post-1948 (nationalisation)
In 1947 nos.136/8/49 & nos.342/4/7/81/7/8 were placed out of use leaving just thirty-one to enter into British Railways ownership upon nationalisation in 1948. However, with withdrawals rapidly continuing only no.381 physically received its new BR number (30381 in ‘Sunshine Yellow’ and still with ‘Southern’ on its black unlined tender). But it too was withdrawn (April 1951) before no.389 (failed July 1951) and no.384 (already condemned but serviceable to August 1951). None of the K10 class carried the Railway Executive's Standard Livery for British Railways (as published in February 1949).

Operational details 

The class shared the same inability to sustain their power over long distances as the C8s, leading to the K10s being employed only on occasional main line trips over short distances.  The class therefore gained the nickname of "Small Hoppers" from their crews.  The aforementioned defect was not a hindrance, with the class leading an admirable career on secondary routes.  Due to the LSWR being primarily a passenger railway, there were few heavy goods services that would have proved too much for the design despite its flaws.

Comparison with L11
According to Dendy Marshall, the main differences between the K10 "Small Hoppers" and the L11 "Large Hoppers" were:
 K10,  coupling rods and C8 type boiler
 L11,  coupling rods and T9 type boiler

Preservation
None have been preserved.

References

 Casserley, H.C. (1971) London and South Western locomotives, incorporating Burtt, F. [1949] LSWR locomotives—a survey. Shepperton, Surrey: Ian Allan Limited.

Further reading

 Ian Allan ABC of British Railways Locomotives, 1949 edition, part 2

External links 

 SEMG gallery
 Blood & Custard and associated liveries

K10
4-4-0 locomotives
Railway locomotives introduced in 1901
Scrapped locomotives
Standard gauge steam locomotives of Great Britain